Admiral Flota Sovetskogo Soyuza Kuznetsov ( or "Admiral of the Fleet of the Soviet Union Kuznetsov", originally the name of the fifth ) is an aircraft carrier (heavy aircraft cruiser in Russian classification) serving as the flagship of the Russian Navy. It was built by the Black Sea Shipyard, the sole manufacturer of Soviet aircraft carriers, in Nikolayev within the Ukrainian Soviet Socialist Republic (SSR) and launched in 1985, becoming fully operational in the Russian Navy in 1995. The initial name of the ship was Riga; it was launched as Leonid Brezhnev, embarked on sea trials as Tbilisi, and was finally named Admiral Flota Sovetskogo Soyuza Kuznetsov after Admiral of the Fleet of the Soviet Union Nikolay Gerasimovich Kuznetsov.

She was originally commissioned in the Soviet Navy, and was intended to be the lead ship of the two-ship . However, its sister ship Varyag was still incomplete when the Soviet Union disbanded in 1991.

The ship has been out of service and in drydock for repairs since 2018. The repair process has been hampered by accidents, embezzlement of funds, and other setbacks. After the floating drydock  sank in Kola Bay (Murmansk) in an accident that killed one worker in October 2018, the ship was towed to Sevmorput Yard No 35. In another mishap in December 2019, a major fire killed at least one worker and injured ten others. In June 2022, the ship was transferred to a drydock at the 35th Ship Repair Plant in Murmansk, where it remained until February 2023. The current projection is that repairs will be completed and the ship will be transferred back to the Russian Navy sometime in 2024.

Design

The design of Admiral Kuznetsov class implies a mission different from that of the United States Navy's carriers.

Admiral Kuznetsovs main fixed-wing aircraft is the multi-role Sukhoi Su-33. It can perform air superiority, fleet defence, and air support missions and can also be used for direct fire support of amphibious assault, reconnaissance and placement of naval mines. The carrier also carries the Kamov Ka-27 and Kamov Ka-27S helicopters for anti-submarine warfare, search and rescue, and small transport.

For take-off of fixed-wing aircraft, Admiral Kuznetsov has a ski-jump at the end of its bow. When taking off, aircraft accelerate toward and up the ski-jump using their afterburners. This results in the aircraft leaving the deck at a higher angle and elevation than on an aircraft carrier with a flat deck and catapults. The ski-jump take-off is less demanding on the pilot's body, since the acceleration is lower, but results in a clearance speed of only  requiring an aircraft design which will not stall at those speeds.

The "cruiser" role is facilitated by Admiral Kuznetsovs complement of 12 long-range surface-to-surface anti-ship P-700 Granit (NATO reporting name: Shipwreck) cruise missiles, resulting in the ship's Russian type designator of "heavy aircraft-carrying missile cruiser".

Unlike most western naval ships that use gas turbines or nuclear power, Admiral Kuznetsov is a conventionally powered ship that uses mazut as a fuel, often leading to a visible trail of heavy black smoke that can be seen at a great distance. Russian naval officials have said that the failure to properly preheat the heavy mazut fuel prior to entering the combustion chamber may contribute to the heavy smoke trail associated with the ship.

Transiting the Turkish Straits

Admiral Kuznetsovs designation as an aircraft-carrying cruiser is very important under the Montreux Convention, as it allows the ship to transit the Turkish Straits. The Convention prohibits countries from sending an aircraft carrier heavier than 15,000 tons through the Straits. Since the ship was built in the Ukrainian SSR, Admiral Kuznetsov would have been stuck in the Black Sea if Turkey had refused permission to pass into the Mediterranean Sea. However, the Convention does not limit the displacement of capital ships operated by Black Sea powers. Turkey allowed Admiral Kuznetsov to transit the Straits, and no signatory to the Montreux Convention ever issued a formal protest of its classification as an aircraft-carrying cruiser.

History

1982–1991: construction and dispute of ownership

Admiral Flota Sovetskogo Soyuza Kuznetsov, constructed at Chernomorskiy Shipyard, also known as Nikolayev South Shipyard, in Nikolayev within the Ukrainian Soviet Socialist Republic (SSR) was launched in 1985, and became fully operational in 1995. An official ceremony marking the start of construction took place on 1 September 1982; in fact it was laid down in 1983. The vessel was first named Riga, then the name was changed to Leonid Brezhnev, this was followed by Tbilisi. Finally, on 4 October 1990, it was renamed Admiral Flota Sovetskogo Soyuza N.G. Kuznetsov, referred to in short as Admiral Kuznetsov. The ship was 71% complete by mid-1989. In November 1989 it undertook its first aircraft operations.

After the 1991 Soviet coup d'état attempt and the independence of Ukraine, Ukrainian president Leonid Kravchuk sent a telegram to the ship's commander Viktor Yarygin, declaring that Admiral Kuznetsov was Ukrainian property, and that the ship should remain in Sevastopol until the Ukrainian government made a decision on its fate. Deputy commander of the Northern Fleet Yuri Ustimenko urgently arrived from the Arctic to pre-empt the Ukrainian government and gave the order for Admiral Kuznetsov to sail to Vidyayevo so the ship could remain in the Soviet fleet. In December 1991, it sailed from the Black Sea to join the Northern Fleet.

1995–1996 deployment
From 23 December 1995 through 22 March 1996 Admiral Kuznetsov made its first 90-day Mediterranean deployment with 13 Su-33, 2 Su-25 UTG, and 11 helicopters aboard. The deployment of the Russian Navy's flagship was undertaken to mark the 300th anniversary of the establishment of the Russian Navy in October 1696. The deployment was to allow the carrier, which was accompanied by a frigate, destroyer and oiler, to adapt to the Mediterranean climate and to perform continuous flight operations until 21:00 each day, as the Barents Sea only receives about one hour of sunlight during this time of year. During that period the carrier lay at anchor off the port of Tartus, Syria. Its aircraft often made flights close to the Israeli shore line and were escorted by Israeli F-16s. During the deployment, a severe water shortage occurred due to evaporators breaking down.

1997–1998 overhaul
The ship was immobilized in a Northern Fleet shipyard at the end of 1997 after repairs had been halted due to a lack of funding. The overhaul was finally completed in July 1998, and the ship returned to active service in the Northern fleet on 3 November 1998.

2000–2006

Admiral Kuznetsov remained in port for two years before preparing for another Mediterranean deployment scheduled for the winter of 2000–2001. This deployment was canceled due to the explosion and sinking of the nuclear-powered submarine . Admiral Kuznetsov participated in the Kursk rescue and salvage operations in late 2000. Plans for further operations were postponed or cancelled. In late 2003 and early 2004, Admiral Kuznetsov went to sea for inspection and sea trials. In October 2004, the ship participated in a fleet exercise of the Russian Navy in the Atlantic Ocean. During a September 2005 exercise, a Su-33 accidentally fell from the carrier into the Atlantic Ocean. On 27 September 2006, it was announced that Admiral Kuznetsov would return to service in the Northern Fleet by the year's end, following another modernization to correct some technical issues. Admiral Vladimir Masorin, Commander-in-Chief of the Russian Navy, also stated that Su-33 fighters assigned to it would return after undergoing their own maintenance and refits.

2007–2008 deployment
From 5 December 2007 through 3 February 2008 Admiral Kuznetsov made its second Mediterranean deployment. On 11 December 2007, Admiral Kuznetsov passed by Norwegian oil platforms in the North Sea,  outside Bergen, Norway. Su-33 fighters and Kamov helicopters were launched from Admiral Kuznetsov while within international waters; Norwegian helicopter services to the rigs were halted due to the collision risk with the Russian aircraft. Admiral Kuznetsov later participated in an exercise on the Mediterranean Sea, together with 11 other Russian surface ships and 47 aircraft, performing three tactical training missions using live and simulated air and surface missile launches. Admiral Kuznetsov and its escorts returned to Severomorsk on 3 February 2008. Following maintenance, it returned to sea on 11 October 2008 for the Stability 2008 strategic exercises held in the Barents Sea. On 12 October 2008, Russian President Dmitry Medvedev visited the ship during the exercise.

2008–2009 deployment
From 5 December 2008 through 2 March 2009, Admiral Kuznetsov made its third Mediterranean deployment. On 5 December 2008, the carrier and several other vessels left Severomorsk for the Atlantic for a combat training tour, including joint drills with Russia's Black Sea Fleet and visits to several Mediterranean ports. On 7 January 2009, a small fire broke out onboard Admiral Kuznetsov while anchored off Turkey. The fire, caused by a short circuit, led to the death of one crew member by carbon monoxide poisoning. On 16 February 2009, it was involved in a large oil spill, along with other Russian naval vessels, while refuelling off the south coast of Ireland. On 2 March 2009, Admiral Kuznetsov returned to Severomorsk, and in September 2010 it left dry dock after scheduled repairs and preparations for a training mission in the Barents Sea, later that month.

2011–2012 deployment

The Russian Main Navy Staff announced that Admiral Kuznetsov would begin a deployment to the Atlantic and Mediterranean in December 2011. In November 2011, it was announced that Admiral Kuznetsov would lead a squadron to Russia's naval facility in Tartus.

A Russian naval spokesman announced via the Izvestia daily that "The call of the Russian ships in Tartus should not be seen as a gesture towards what is going on in Syria... This was planned already in 2010 when there were no such events there" noting that Admiral Kuznetsov would also be making port calls in Beirut, Genoa and Cyprus. On 29 November 2011, Army General Nikolay Makarov, Chief of the Russian General Staff, said that Russian ships in the Mediterranean were due to exercises rather than events in Syria, and noted that Admiral Kuznetsovs size does not allow it to moor in Tartus.

On 6 December 2011, Admiral Kuznetsov and its escort ships departed the Northern Fleet home base in Severomorsk for a Mediterranean deployment to exercise with ships from the Russian Baltic and Black Sea Fleets. Admiral Kuznetsov then sailed around the top of Scotland and into the Atlantic past western Ireland, where it conducted flight operations with its Sukhoi Su-33 'Flanker' jets and Kamov Ka-27 helicopters in international airspace. On 8 January 2012, Admiral Kuznetsov anchored near shore outside Tartus while other ships from its escort entered the port to use the leased Russian naval support facility to replenish their supplies, after which all ships continued their deployment on 9 January. In February 2012, Admiral Kuznetsov returned to its home base of Severomorsk, having lost propulsion during the return voyage in the Bay of Biscay. The tugboat  took the vessel in tow and aided Admiral Kuznetsovs return.

2013–2014 deployment

On 1 June 2013, it was announced that the ship would return to the Mediterranean by the end of the year, and on 17 December, Admiral Kuznetsov departed its home base for the Mediterranean. On 1 January 2014, Admiral Kuznetsov celebrated New Year's Day while at anchor in international waters of the Moray Firth off northeast Scotland. The anchorage allowed replenishment of ship's supplies and respite for the crew from stormy weather off the southwest coast of Norway. It then proceeded to the Mediterranean Sea, docking in Cyprus on 28 February. In May 2014, the ship and its task group: the Kirov-class nuclear-powered cruiser Petr Velikiy; tankers Sergey Osipov, Kama and Dubna; the ocean-going tug Altay and the  Minsk (part of the Black Sea Fleet), passed the UK while sailing for home. Despite financial and technical problems, resulting in limited operations for the ship, it was expected that Admiral Kuznetsov would remain in active service until at least 2030.

2016–2017 deployment

Admiral Kuznetsov set sail on 15 October 2016 from Severomorsk for the Mediterranean, accompanied by seven other vessels of the Russian Navy including the nuclear-powered battlecruiser  and two s. The carrier was accompanied by an ocean-going tugboat as a precaution due to potential propulsion failure. The carrier air wing included 6-8 Sukhoi Su-33 fighters, four MiG-29KR/KUBR multi-role aircraft, Ka-52K "Katran" navalised attack helicopters, Ka-31R "Helix" AEW&C helicopters and Ka-27PS "Helix-D" search and rescue helicopters. All the Su-33 aircraft had been upgraded with the Gefest SVP-24 bombsights for free-fall bombs, giving them a limited ground-attack capability. Analysts suggested that a lack of trained pilots restricted the number of fixed-wing aircraft that could be deployed from the carrier.

In the largest Russian military deployment since the Cold War, the carrier battle group sailed through the English Channel on 21 October. The British Royal Navy responded to this test by sending two of its own ships to escort the Russian warships. On 26 October 2016, the ship was reported to have passed through the Strait of Gibraltar and refuelled at sea off North Africa the following day. On 3 November 2016, the carrier battle group paused off the east coast of Crete. On 14 November 2016, a MiG-29K crashed into the sea after taking off from the carrier. The pilot ejected safely from the plane and was rescued by helicopter. The plane had run out of fuel waiting to land while the crew was attempting to repair a broken arresting cable. The carrier commander could have diverted the aircraft to land at a nearby airbase, but hesitated in the hope that the arresting gear would be repaired in time.

On 15 November 2016—as part of a large-scale engagement—Admiral Kuznetsov launched Su-33 strikes against the positions of terrorist groups Islamic State and Al-Nusra in the provinces of Idlib and Homs in Syria. This was the first time the aircraft carrier had ever participated in combat operations. The Russian Defence Ministry later reported that at least 30 militants had been killed as a result of those strikes, including three field commanders, among them Abul Baha al-Asfari, leader of Al-Nusra reserve forces in the provinces of Homs and Aleppo. Al-Asfari had also planned and led several insurgent attacks on the city of Aleppo. The Su-33s reportedly used  precision-guided munitions. On 3 December 2016, an Su-33 crashed into the sea after attempting to land on the carrier. The pilot was safely recovered by a search and rescue helicopter. Later it was revealed that the arresting gear mechanism had failed to hold the aircraft, and was damaged in the attempt. Following this second incident, the air wing was transferred to shore at Khmeimim Air Base near Latakia to continue military operations while the carrier's arresting gear issues were addressed.

In early January 2017, it was announced that Admiral Kuznetsov and its battlegroup would be ceasing operations in Syria and returning to Russia as part of a scaling back of Russian involvement in the conflict. During its deployment off Syria, aircraft from Admiral Kuznetsov carried out 420 combat missions, hitting 1,252 hostile targets. On 11 January 2017, Admiral Kuznetsov was conducting live-fire training exercises in the Mediterranean off the coast of Libya. The Russian defence ministry announced that on 11 January, Admiral Kuznetsov was visited by Libya's military leader Khalifa Haftar, who had a video conference with Russian defence minister Sergey Shoygu while on board.

On 20 January, Admiral Kuznetsov was sighted passing west through the Strait of Gibraltar and six days later, it was escorted back along the English Channel by three Eurofighter Typhoons of the Royal Air Force and the Type 23 frigate . It arrived back in Severomorsk on 9 February. On 23 February 2017, President Vladimir Putin said that the ship's deployment to the Mediterranean had been his personal initiative.

2017–present: overhaul

Admiral Kuznetsov started an overhaul and modernization program in the first quarter of 2017 to extend its service life by 25 years. The ship was to undergo modernization at the 35th Ship Repair Plant in Murmansk between 2018 and 2021, upgrading the ship's power plant and electronics systems.

On 30 October 2018, the ship was damaged when Russia's biggest floating drydock, sank, causing one of its 70-ton cranes to crash onto the ship's flight deck, leaving behind a  hole. One person was reported missing and four were injured as the drydock sank in Kola Bay. The ship was in the process of being removed from the dock when the incident occurred and was towed to a nearby yard after the incident. The cost of repairing the damage was estimated to be RUB 70million (about US$1million). The fallen crane was removed by the end of 2018.

In late May 2019, repair work of the aircraft carrier was underway. That same month, it was also announced that two graving docks in Murmansk would be merged and enlarged to accommodate the ship, the work taking a year and a half. In December 2019, a major fire broke out on board the ship as work continued on the ship's refit. Two people died and more than a dozen were injured in the fire, and damage to the ship was estimated at US$8million.

In June 2021, Vladimir Korolev, Vice President of the United Shipbuilding Corporation announced that the overhaul and upgrade of Admiral Kuznetsov was expected to be completed by the first half of 2023. The avionics, flight deck with the ski jump, electric equipment, and the power plant are expected to be replaced as part of this process. The carrier would also receive a new fully domestic takeoff and landing control system, with the onboard airpower remaining the same. Due to the lack of a large enough drydock, a new drydock was being constructed in Murmansk. In November 2021 it was reported that "bad weather" had caused significant delays to repair work which might push back the completion of the refit by more than one year. 

The ship was finally dry-docked on 20 May 2022. By 27 July 2022, the drydock had been drained, allowing repairs on the aircraft carrier to commence. On 15 August 2022, the head of the United Shipbuilding Corporation confirmed that Admiral Kuznetsov would be handed over to the Russian Navy in the first quarter of 2024, and that the ship is expected to remain in service for at least another 25 years. On 22 December 2022, as the ship was being prepared to leave drydock, another fire occurred. The fire was extinguished, and no casualties were reported. On 25 January 2023, it was reported that Admiral Kuznetsov would leave the drydock in February 2023. The aircraft carrier was removed from the drydock on 21 February 2023, although it was initially reported that the operation had been suspended due to heavy fog. Current projections are that the overhaul of the carrier will last into 2024.

Gallery

See also
 List of aircraft carriers
 List of aircraft carriers of Russia and the Soviet Union

References

External links

 Kreml-class aircraft carrier at GlobalSecurity.org
 SU-25 at Faqs.org
 Video clip of Su-33 operating on the deck of Kuznetsov
 Aircraft cruiser Admiral Kuznetsov - on Russian News Agency TASS Official Infographic
 Admiral Kuznetsov rejoining the Northern Fleet at RIA Novosti

Admiral Kuznetsov-class aircraft carriers
Ships built at the Black Sea Shipyard
1985 ships
Cold War aircraft carriers of the Soviet Union
Aircraft carriers of Russia
Ships of the Russian Northern Fleet
Russian military intervention in the Syrian civil war
Ships built in the Soviet Union
Aircraft carrier fires